Vittorio Podestà (born 3 June 1973 in Lavagna) is a male Italian paralympic cyclist.

Biography
He is an engineer and he lives in Chiavari with his wife Barbara.

Achievements

See also
Italy at the 2008 Summer Paralympics
Italy at the 2012 Summer Paralympics
Italy at the 2016 Summer Paralympics

References

External links
 Athlete profile at IPC web site

1973 births
Living people
Paralympic cyclists of Italy
Paralympic gold medalists for Italy
Paralympic silver medalists for Italy
Paralympic bronze medalists for Italy
Medalists at the 2008 Summer Paralympics
Medalists at the 2012 Summer Paralympics
Medalists at the 2016 Summer Paralympics
Paralympic medalists in cycling
Cyclists at the 2008 Summer Paralympics
Cyclists at the 2012 Summer Paralympics
Cyclists at the 2016 Summer Paralympics